Shannon Powell (born April 8, 1962) is an American jazz and ragtime drummer. He has toured internationally and played with Ellis Marsalis, Harry Connick, Jr., Danny Barker, Branford Marsalis, Wynton Marsalis and the Lincoln Center Jazz Orchestra, Diana Krall, Earl King, Dr. John, Marcus Roberts, John Scofield, Jason Marsalis, Leroy Jones, Nicholas Payton, and Donald Harrison Jr. Powell toured and recorded with fellow New Orleans native, Harry Connick Jr.

Early life
Shannon was born and raised in the musically and culturally historic Tremé  neighborhood. Adjacent to the French Quarter and now made famous by the popular HBO program of the same name, the Faubourg Tremé was once a thriving community and has been home to many famous musicians, including Alphonse Picou, George Lewis, and Kermit Ruffins.
Shannon’s grandmother Veronica Batiste, played piano for silent film and in Baptist church. By age 6 he was playing drums regularly in The First Garden Christ Church.

Danny Barker
The sounds of the city of New Orleans and the Tremé neighborhood played an important role in Shannon Powell’s development, as did the multitude of musicians surrounding him but none more than Danny Barker. Mr. Barker asked Shannon to join the Fairview Baptist Church Marching Band with other notable musicians like, Leroy Jones, Wynton and Branford Marsalis, Dr. Michael White, Joe Torregano, Anthony "Tuba Fats" Lacen, Charles, Kirk Joseph, Gene Olufemi, and Lucien Barbarin.
Shannon’s first paying gig was at Jazz Fest as a member of Danny Barker’s own band, The Jazzhounds, at the age of 14 years.

Teens
In high school Powell was a member of the well-respected concert band at Joseph S. Clark High School and member of trumpeter Leroy Jones' first band, New Orleans Finest.  He went on to study with pianist Willie Metcalf Jr. at the Black Academy of Arts. Like Powell’s previous mentor, Metcalf asked him to join his band, again with classmates, Wynton and Branford Marsalis. Later, Shannon was an original member of the Taste of New Orleans led by tenor saxophonist, David Lastie.

Career
Powell, a regular at Jazz Fest has played all over Europe and Asia in trio gigs with the likes of Ellis Marsalis, Tommy Ridgely, Johnny Adams, Kermit Ruffins, and Lillian Boutté. He now plays with the Preservation Hall Jazz Band and leads his own quartet with Jason Marsalis, Steve Masakowski, and Roland Guerin.

Awards
Powell and Herlin Riley were awarded the 2010 Ascona Jazz Award from the Ascona Jazz Festival in Ascona, Switzerland.

Film
Powell's interviews and performances are featured heavily in the 2011 documentary film about New Orleans musical culture, Tradition is a Temple.

References

External links

 
 At Preservation Hall
 Tradition is a Temple (film)
 Ascona Jazz Festival(award)

1962 births
Living people
20th-century American drummers
American male drummers
20th-century American male musicians
Preservation Hall Jazz Band members
American jazz drummers
Fairview Baptist Church Marching Band members